Kocoń  is a village in the administrative district of Gmina Ślemień, within Żywiec County, Silesian Voivodeship, in southern Poland.

The village has a population of 702.

References

Villages in Żywiec County